Tommie Creek is a stream in Polk County in the U.S. state of Missouri. It is a tributary of Slagle Creek.

The elevation of the confluence is 938 feet.

Variant names were "Tommy Creek" and "Tomahawk Creek". The creek was so named on account of the discovery of tomahawk relics in the area.

See also
List of rivers of Missouri

References

Rivers of Polk County, Missouri
Rivers of Missouri